Nelson Andrew Riis (born January 10, 1942) is a Canadian businessman and former politician and New Democratic Party (NDP) Member of Parliament (MP).

Career
A geographer and teacher by profession, Riis taught in public schools and at the post-secondary level. He taught at what is now known as Thompson Rivers University, where he served as chair of social sciences for ten years. He served as an alderman in Kamloops, British Columbia, from 1973 to 1978, and as a school trustee from 1978 until 1980. He was director of the Thompson-Nicola Regional District. Riis was active in Kamloops and surrounding communities and was named as honorary member in many organizations. He is a fellow of the Royal Canadian Geographic Society.

Riis was first elected to the House of Commons of Canada in the 1980 federal election. He served as House Leader from 1986 to 1996, and as critic for finance for a number of years. He also served as caucus chair from 1996 until his defeat in the 2000 federal election. During this period he hosted a weekly television program, spoke at party functions throughout Canada, served on a wide range of parliamentary committees and wrote a weekly column for five BC newspapers.

On the conservative wing of the social democratic NDP, Riis was a contributing author to a report by the libertarian think tank Fraser Institute on how to spend the fiscal surplus. He championed small business concerns in the NDP and founded a small business caucus. His primary area of interest and expertize was in the area of finance.

Riis was rumoured at various times in the 1980s to have been offered cabinet positions in the Brian Mulroney government if he were willing to cross the floor and join the Progressive Conservative Party.

During his parliamentary career he introduced legislation formally making ice hockey Canada's winter sport, which was eventually signed into law. Shortly after the August 9, 1988 trade that saw Wayne Gretzky traded from the Edmonton Oilers to the Los Angeles Kings, Riis emphatically demanded that the government block it. Riis issued a press release about the Gretzky trade, suggesting that the Canadian federal government ought to do something to prevent Gretzky from leaving.

He was only one of a handful of NDP MPs to survive the 1993 federal election.

From 2000 though late 2005, Riis was an executive with Canadian Rockport Homes International, a company that builds low-cost, quality, modular housing in developing nations. He resigned those positions on November 22, 2005 and now serves as Rockport's global ambassador and is focused on the company's overseas expansion. This is as a result of his being charged by the BC Securities Commission for making outrageous claims with respect to the amount the company would earn.  He also paid a settlement of $40,000.00 and was forbidden from acting as a director or officer of any issuer or engaging in investor relations for two years.    As of 2010, he is working as a long term care planning specialist in Ottawa.

In 2023, Riis urged Justin Trudeau to follow through on his promise to ban the export of horses for slaughter, liking the practice to "cruel and unusual punishment" and "torture."

References

External links
 

1942 births
Living people
Canadian Lutherans
Members of the House of Commons of Canada from British Columbia
New Democratic Party MPs
British Columbia municipal councillors